The Chindwin River (also called the Ningthi River) is a river flowing entirely in Myanmar, and the largest tributary of the country's main river, the Ayeyarwady. Its official name is also spelled Chindwinn.

Sources
The Chindwin originates in the broad Hukawng Valley of Kachin State of Burma, roughly
, where the Tanai, the Tabye, the Tawan, and the Taron (also known as Turong or Towang) rivers meet.

The headwaters of the Tanai  are at about
It flows due north for the first part until it reaches the Hukawng Valley. The river then turns to the west and flows through the middle of the plain, joined by the Tabye, the Tawan, and the Taron rivers from the right bank. These rivers drain the mountain ranges to the north and northeast of the Hukawng valley.

Course
The Tanai exits the Hukawng valley through the Taron or Turong valley and through a sharp defile in the river. It then takes on the name of Chindwin, and maintains a general southerly course. It passes the town of Singkaling Hkamti on the left bank, then the town of Homalin, also on the left bank.

The river's course is generally southwesterly until the town of Mingin.  It then takes a more southeasterly course entering into broad central plain, passing the city of Monywa on the left bank. Its course at this point forms the boundary between the Sagaing District of Sagaing Region and the Pakokku District of Magway Region.

The lowest mouth of the Chindwin is, according to tradition, an artificial channel, cut by one of the kings of Bagan (Pagan). It was choked up for centuries until 1824 when it was opened out by an exceptional flood. Satellite pictures show this lowest channel to be the widest one today.

Tributaries
 Uyu River is the largest tributary joining the Chindwin river just below Homalin on the left. The famous jade mines at Hpakant lie in the headwaters of the Uyu.
 Myittha River, draining the Kale valley, joins on the right further downstream. The town of Kalewa is on the left bank of their confluence.

Towns

Hkamti
Htamanthi
Homalin
Mawlaik
Kalewa
Kalaymyo
Mingin
Monywa

Environment 
Much of Chindwin's course lies within mountain ranges and forests.  Due to the difficulty of access, much of it remains unspoilt. The government of Burma recently created a very large (2,500 square mile) sanctuary for the endangered tiger within the Hukawng Valley.

History 
The mountain ranges to the west of the Chindwin are formidable, yet not totally impregnable to armies. The Kabaw valley saw many an invasion by the kingdom of Manipur to the west, most notably during the reign of King Garibaniwaj (1709–1748) when his army crossed over the Chindwin and the Mu, took Myedu,  and reached as far as Sagaing opposite the capital Ava. The tables were turned in 1758 after King Alaungpaya ascended the Burmese throne. The Burmese army invaded and occupied Manipur and Assam marching across the western mountain ranges, and even encroached upon British India.

During World War II, when the Japanese had cut off sea access, the British army and other allied forces under General Joseph Stilwell retreated on foot to India across the same mountains, with disastrous results, mainly due to disease and hunger. The Ledo Road was built across the Hukawng valley to supply China. The Chindwin was a major barrier both for the Japanese trying to invade India and for the Allied forces to reoccupy Burma.

Ethnography and culture 

The chindwin river has a great impact on the culture of western Burma. Central Sino-Tibetan (which includes Meithei) languages originated from valley areas of this river.

Economics 
The Chindwin is served by regular river-going vessels up to the town of Homalin. Teak forests within its drainage area have been a valuable resource since ancient times. The Hukawng Valley is known for its abundance of Burmese amber. Along the river, there are deposits of jade, but Hpakant in the headwaters of the Uyu river is the only place in the world where the finest jade - known as jadeite or imperial jade - is found, along with an abundance of fish.

Notes

Bibliography 
J. G. Scott, Gazetteer of Upper Burma and the Shan States. 5 vols. Rangoon, 1900–1901

External links

Rivers Network - Chindwin Blog
The Chindwin River

Rivers of Myanmar